North Macedonia first competed as an independent nation at the Olympic Games at the 1996 Summer Olympics, then as the "former Yugoslav Republic of Macedonia", and has participated in every Summer Olympic Games and Winter Olympic Games since then. Previously, until 1988, Macedonian athletes competed for Yugoslavia, and in 1992 as Independent Olympic Participants. The provisional appellation of "former Yugoslav Republic of Macedonia" was used until 2018, in the context of the Macedonia naming dispute.

Medal tables

Medals by Summer Games

Medals by Winter Games

Medals by sport

List of medalists 
Two athletes representing North Macedonia since 1996 have won an Olympic medal.

List of Yugoslav medalists from North Macedonia
Several other athletes from the Socialist Republic of Macedonia (a constituent country of the former SFR Yugoslavia) have also won Olympic medals, competing for Yugoslavia.

See also
 List of flag bearers for North Macedonia at the Olympics
 North Macedonia at the Paralympics

Notes

External links